Inga Rundvold Hook-Kuhn (1920 – February 4, 2004) was a broadcast reporter and host and one of Washington D.C's first on-air media personalities in the 1950s and 1960s. She is sometime referred to as "DC's First Lady of Television". Rundvold is best known for her television programs Inga's Angle and Let's Go Places on WRC-TV, formally known as WNBW-TV.

Biography
Inga Rundvold was born in 1920 in Stryn, Norway, and moved to Washington D.C. in 1930 with her family. She graduated from Montgomery Blair High School and began her career as a fashion model in New York City for the Conover Agency before transitioning to writing about fashion for the Washington Times-Herald. In 1951 she began hosting, writing, and producing her own show, Inga's Angle (later changed to Today with Inga) which ran for 16 years, the longest running early program of that time. She interviewed many famous people including John F. Kennedy, Bette Davis, Lyndon B. Johnson, Hubert H. Humphrey, Milton Berle, Gregory Peck, Charlton Heston, Kim Novak, and Arthur Schlesinger among others. Her on-air persona was warm yet glamorous and she was known for deftly switching quickly from one conversation topic to the next. Besides interviewing political and celebrity guests, the show also had beauty, exercise, and commercial product segments.

Rundvold retired from her show in 1967 and focused her career on travel writing. She produced Let's Go Places a 30-minute show about foreign travel, and freelanced for the New York Daily News, Chicago Tribune, Los Angeles Times, and others. She also helped create the Around the World Venture, an organization promoting U.S. tourism to foreign press and travel offices. Rundvold also worked with the American Revolution Bicentennial Commission and the National Trust for Historic Preservation and was an active member of the National Press Club.

Inga Rundvold died from complications of a stroke on February 4, 2004, in Richmond, Virginia.

References 

1920 births
2004 deaths
American women television presenters
People from Stryn
Norwegian emigrants to the United States
20th-century American women
20th-century American people